The following list sorts countries by the total market capitalization of all domestic companies listed in the country, according to data from the World Bank. Market capitalization, commonly called market cap, is the market value of a publicly traded company's outstanding shares.

Ranking

Historical development of world market cap

See also 
 List of public corporations by market capitalization
 List of stock exchanges
 Buffett indicator

References 

countries by stock market capitalization
stock market capitalization